Taylor Park is an area of land located in the area of Norden in the Metropolitan Borough of Rochdale, Greater Manchester, England. It was originally made into a park because it is situated on a mine shaft for the mine that used to be in operation in the locality and therefore makes it unsuitable for building on.

Renovation 
In recent years, a group of local residents have spent time revamping the park after it had fallen into a state of disrepair due to inattention.

As part of the process, a number of cherry trees that had been planted on the lawns were removed to allow sunlight to reach the grass and plants, and a number of other trees were removed or trimmed to allow the park to become more open. The lawns were also treated and are gradually recovering. Work on the pathways and borders is still to be completed.

Name 
The park is known to residents around it as Taylor Park, probably because it is located right next to Taylor Avenue.

Parks and commons in the Metropolitan Borough of Rochdale